Cubbyhouse is a 2001 Australian horror film, directed by Murray Fahey and starring Joshua Leonard (of The Blair Witch Project fame) and Belinda McClory (The Matrix). It screened at the 2001 Cannes Film Festival.

It was produced by David Hannay who said "I’ve been a fan of Murray Fahey’s since he was a film school student and I regard him as almost unique in being a true independent filmmaker who writes, produces, directs and acts in his own films."

Plot

Cast
 Joshua Leonard as Danny Graham
 Belinda McClory as Lynn Graham
 Lauren Hewett as Bronwyn McChristie
 Jerome Ehlers as Harrison / Harlow
 Craig McLachlan as Bill
 Chris Brown as Newsreader
 Peter Callan as Don
 Madison Dohnt as Hope
 Murray Fahey as Gary the Pest Man
 Carita Farrer as Sandra Hickey
 Belinda Gavin as Julie
 Steve Harman as Nurse
 Brian Hinzlewood as Joe McChristie
 Stefan Kluka as Surf Reporter

Notes

References

External links 
 

2001 films
2001 horror films
Australian horror films
Haunted house films
Films directed by Murray Fahey
Australian comedy horror films
2000s English-language films
2000s Australian films